Chum Krairoek (complete title Chao Chom Manda Chum Krairoek Royal Highness Consort of King Chulalongkorn (Rama V) of Siam was a daughter of Phraya Mongkolrat Rajamontri (Chuang Krairoek) and Khai Krairoek.

She moved to the Grand Palace to be a royal consort of King Chulalongkorn with the royal title Chao Chom Manda (Royal High Consort)

She had 2 children with King Chulalongkorn;

 Princess Adorndibyanibha
 Princess Suchitra Bharani

References 

Chum Krairoek
Chum Krairoek
Chum Krairoek
1869 births
1911 deaths
19th-century Chakri dynasty
20th-century Chakri dynasty